The Japurá River or Caquetá River is a river about  long in the Amazon basin. It rises in Colombia and flows eastward through Brazil to join the Amazon River.

Course

The river rises as the Caquetá River in the Andes in southwest Colombia. 
The Caquetá River rises near the sources of the Magdalena River, and augments its volume from many branches as it courses through Colombia.
It flows southeast into Brazil, where it is called the Japurá. The Japurá enters the Amazon River through a network of channels. It is navigable by small boats in Brazil.
West of the Rio Negro, the Solimões River (as the Amazon's upper Brazilian course is called) receives three more imposing streams from the northwest—the Japurá, the Içá (referred to as the Putumayo before it crosses over into Brazil), and the Napo.

Environment

For much of its length the river flows through the Purus várzea ecoregion.

Much of the jungle through which the eastern Caquetá originally flowed has been cleared for pasture, crops of rice, corn, manioc, and sugar cane, and in the past two decades, particularly coca crops.

Navigation

The 19th-century Brazilian historian and geographer José Coelho da Gama e Abreu, the Baron of Marajó, attributed  of navigable stretches to it. Jules Crevaux, who descended it, described it as full of obstacles to navigation, the current very strong and the stream frequently interrupted by rapids and cataracts. It was initially supposed to have eight mouths, but colonial administrator Francisco Xavier Ribeiro Sampaio, in the historic report of his voyage of 1774, determined that there was but one real mouth, and that the supposed others are all furos or canos, as the diverting secondary channels of the Amazonian rivers are known.

In 1864–1868, the Brazilian government made a somewhat careful examination of the Brazilian part of the river, as far up as the rapid of Cupati. Several very easy and almost complete water routes exist between the Japurá and Negro across the low, flat intervening country. The Baron of Marajó wrote that there were six of them, and one which connects the upper Japurá with the Vaupés branch of the Negro; thus the indigenous tribes of the respective valleys have easy contact with each other.

The river serves as a principal means of transportation, being plied by tiny dugout canoes, larger ones, motorboats, and riverboats known locally as lanchas.  The boats carry a multitude of cargoes, sometimes being chartered, sometimes even being traveling general stores. In the Colombian section, the presence of guerrillas and soldiers used to limit river traffic.

See also
Caquetá Department

References

External links

Environmental information of Colombian Amazon region

Rivers of Amazonas (Brazilian state)
Rivers of Colombia
Tributaries of the Amazon River
International rivers of South America